Houvenkopf or Hovenkopf Mountain is a mountain in Bergen County, New Jersey. It extends into New York, where it forms the western side of the southern entrance to Ramapo Pass. Houvenkopf Mountain is located in Mahwah, New Jersey and overlooks Hillburn to the north, Suffern to the east, and Ringwood, New Jersey to the west. It is part of the Ramapo Mountains.

History 
Houvenkopf Mountain's name is derived from the Dutch "Hooge Kop," meaning "High Head." Its summit was known as Split Rock or Pigeon Rock, because locals used to spread grain around the summit boulders to catch passenger pigeons.

The mountain was the subject of the poem titled "Mount Houvenkopf" by Joyce Kilmer, written in 1918.

Parts of the mountain are publicly accessible as part of the Ramapo Valley County Reservation.

References

External links 
 NY-NJ Trail Conference: Ramapo Valley County Reservation

Mountains of Bergen County, New Jersey
Mahwah, New Jersey
Mountains of New Jersey
Ramapos